Phyang (previously known as Fiang) is a village in Leh district of Ladakh in India. It is in the Leh tehsil. The Phyang Monastery is in this village. This is one of the largest inhabited villages of Ladakh, comprising eight clusters: Phulungs, Phyang, Tsakma, Changmachan, Gaon, Thangnak, Chusgo and Mankhang. It is in a south-facing valley in the Ladakh Range of mountains. There is an old dilapidated castle near the cluster of Phyang on a hilltop. Just below this castle, there is a single-room temple, Lobon, with paintings of Ladakh, but in the tourism industry, it is known as Guru Lhakhang. The Tokpo river is in the middle of the valley. The village has some tourist facilities, including a guesthouse and campsites. Hidden North guesthouse is just opposite the site of Guru Lhakhang at Tsakma cluster.

Demographics 
According to the 2011 census of India, Fiang has 352 households. The effective literacy rate (i.e. the literacy rate of population excluding children aged 6 and below) is 75.37%.

References

Villages in Leh tehsil